Aspergillus leporis is an anamorph species of fungus in the genus Aspergillus. It is from the Flavi section. The species was first described in 1979. It has been isolated from the dung of Lepus townsendii. Aspergillus leporis produces leporin A and leporin B. It has also been reported to produce antibiotic Y, kojic acid, and pseurotin.

Growth and morphology

A. leporis has been cultivated on both Czapek yeast extract agar (CYA) plates and Malt Extract Agar Oxoid® (MEAOX) plates. The growth morphology of the colonies can be seen in the pictures below.

References

Further reading
 
 
 
 

leporis
Fungi described in 1966